Cvetež is a former settlement in the Municipality of Litija in central Slovenia. It is now part of the village of Vovše. The area is part of the traditional region of Upper Carniola and is now included with the rest of the municipality in the Central Sava Statistical Region.

Geography
Cvetež stands in the westernmost part of Vovše, along a road on a ridge known as Holy Mount in the Central Sava Valley.

History
Cvetež had a population of 26 living in four houses in 1880, and 26 living in five houses in 1900. Cvetež was annexed by Vovše in 1952, ending its existence as a separate settlement.

References

External links

Cvetež on Geopedia

Populated places in the Municipality of Litija